This is a list of Antarctic ice streams.

A complete list of Antarctic ice streams is not available. Names and locations of Antarctic ice features, including those listed below, can be found in the Scientific Committee on Antarctic Research, Gazetteer. Major Antarctic ice drainage systems are given by Rignot and Thomas (2002). These include the ice streams with the greatest flow, which are listed below.

References

Ice streams